Naraingarh Assembly constituency (also: Narayangarh) is one of the 90 assembly seats of Haryana in the Ambala district of the Indian state of Haryana.

Members of Legislative Assembly

References

External links 
 Haryana elections

Ambala
Assembly constituencies of Haryana